John Coffee (1772–1833) was an American planter and general in Tennessee militia.

John Coffee may also refer to:

John C. Coffee (born 1944), American law professor at Columbia University
John E. Coffee (1782–1836), general in Georgia militia and US Congressman 
John M. Coffee (1897–1983),  U.S. Representative from Washington state
John T. Coffee (1816–1890), Confederate general during the American Civil War

See also
John Coffee Hays (1817–1883), Texan ranger captain and military officer
John Coffey (disambiguation)
Coffey (disambiguation)
Coffee (surname)